Oleg Andreyevich Roganov (born 26 April 1995) is a Russian football player. He plays for FC Krylia Sovetov-2 Samara.

Club career
He made his debut in the Russian Professional Football League for FC Lada-Togliatti on 3 August 2018 in a game against FC Zenit-Izhevsk.

References

External links
 Profile by Russian Professional Football League
 

1995 births
Sportspeople from Tolyatti
Living people
Russian footballers
Association football defenders
PFC Krylia Sovetov Samara players
FC Dacia Chișinău players
FC Lada-Tolyatti players
Moldovan Super Liga players
Russian expatriate footballers
Expatriate footballers in Moldova